Floyd Patterson (January 4, 1935 – May 11, 2006) was an American professional boxer who competed from 1952 to 1972, and twice reigned as the world heavyweight champion between 1956 and 1962. At the age of 21, he became the youngest boxer in history to win the title, and was also the first heavyweight to regain the title after losing it. As an amateur, he won a gold medal in the middleweight division at the 1952 Summer Olympics.

In 1956 and 1960, Patterson was voted Fighter of the Year by The Ring magazine and the Boxing Writers Association of America. He was inducted into the International Boxing Hall of Fame in 1991.

Early life
Born January 4, 1935, into a poor family in Waco, North Carolina, Patterson was one of eleven children. Savannah Joe Patterson was his first cousin from out of Arkansas, he went and visited during the early summer years. He experienced an insular and troubled childhood. His family moved to Brooklyn, New York, where Floyd was a truant and a petty thief. At age 10, he was sent to the Wiltwyck School for Boys, a reform school in West Park, New York, which he credited with turning his life around. He stayed there for almost two years. He attended high school in New Paltz, New York, where he succeeded in all sports.

Patterson took up boxing at age fourteen, and was training with the Bedford-Stuyvesant Boxing Association Gym. Three years later, he won the gold medal in the 1952 Helsinki Olympics as a middleweight. In 1952, he won the National Amateur Middleweight Championship and New York Golden Gloves Middleweight Championship. At that time he was spotted by Cus D'Amato, and trained at the Gramercy Gym.

Patterson's younger brother Raymond (born 1942) also became a professional heavyweight boxer and has lived in Gothenburg, Sweden, since 1965 and has worked as a truck driver at Volvo Lastvagnar after his boxing career.

Olympic results
 Round of 16: Defeated Omar Tebakka (France) on points, 3–0
 Quarterfinal: Defeated Leonardus Jansen (Netherlands) by a first-round stoppage
 Semifinal: Defeated Stig Sjölin (Sweden) by disqualification in the third round
 Defeated Vasile Tiță (Romania) by a first-round knockout

Patterson's amateur record was 40 wins (37 by knockout) and 4 defeats.

Patterson carried his hands higher than most boxers, in front of his face. Sportswriters called Patterson's style a "peek-a-boo" stance.

Professional career
Patterson turned pro and steadily rose through the ranks, his only early defeat being an eight-round decision to former Light Heavyweight Champion Joey Maxim on June 7, 1954, at the Eastern Parkway Arena in Brooklyn, New York.

Championship

Although Patterson fought around the light heavyweight limit for much of his early career, he and manager Cus D'Amato always had plans to fight for the Heavyweight Championship. In fact, D'Amato made these plans clear as early as 1954, when he told the press that Patterson was aiming for the heavyweight title. However, after Rocky Marciano announced his retirement as World Heavyweight Champion on April 27, 1956, Patterson was ranked by The Ring magazine as the top light heavyweight contender. After Marciano's announcement, Jim Norris of the International Boxing Club stated that Patterson was one of the six fighters who would take part in an elimination tournament to crown Marciano's successor. The Ring then moved Patterson into the heavyweight rankings, at number five.

Patterson vs. Moore
After beating Tommy "Hurricane" Jackson in an elimination fight, Patterson faced Light Heavyweight Champion Archie Moore on November 30, 1956, for the World Heavyweight Championship. He beat Moore by a knockout in five rounds and became the youngest World Heavyweight Champion in history, at the age of 21 years, 10 months, 3 weeks and 5 days. He was the first Olympic gold medalist to win a professional heavyweight title.

Patterson vs. Johansson I, II & III
After a series of defenses against fringe contenders (Hurricane Jackson, Pete Rademacher, Roy Harris, and Brian London), Patterson met Ingemar Johansson of Sweden, the number one contender, in the first of three fights. Johansson triumphed over Patterson on June 26, 1959, with the referee Ruby Goldstein stopping the fight in the third round after the Swede had knocked Patterson down seven times. Johansson became Sweden's first World Heavyweight Champion, thus becoming a national hero as the first European to defeat an American for the title since 1933.

Patterson knocked out Johansson in the fifth round of their rematch on June 20, 1960, to become the first man in history to regain the Undisputed World Heavyweight Championship. Johansson hit the canvas hard, seemingly out before he landed flat on his back. With glazed eyes, blood trickling from his mouth and his left foot quivering, he was counted out. Johansson lay unconscious for five minutes before he was helped onto a stool.

A third fight between them was held on March 13, 1961, and while Johansson put Patterson on the floor, Patterson retained his title by knockout in the sixth round to win the rubber match in which Patterson was decked twice and Johansson, once in the first round. Johansson had landed both right hands over Floyd's left jab. After getting up from the second knockdown, Floyd abandoned his jab and connected with a left hook that knocked down Johansson. After that, Patterson came on with a strong body attack that wore down Johansson. In the 6th round, Johansson caught Patterson with a solid right. But the power in Ingemar's punches was gone. Patterson won the fight in the 6th round by knockout.

After the third Johansson fight, Patterson defended the title in Toronto on December 4 against Tom McNeeley and retained the title with a fourth-round knockout. However he did not fight number-one contender Sonny Liston. This was due in part to Cus D'Amato, who did not want Patterson in the ring with a boxer with mob connections. As a result, D'Amato turned down any challenges involving the IBC. Eventually, due to a monetary dispute with Jimmy Jacobs, Patterson removed D'Amato from handling his business affairs and agreed to fight Liston.

Patterson vs. Liston I & II

Leading up to the fight, Liston was the major betting-line favorite, though Sports Illustrated predicted that Patterson would win in 15 rounds. Jim Braddock, Jersey Joe Walcott, Ezzard Charles, Rocky Marciano and Ingemar Johansson picked Patterson to win. The fight also carried a number of social implications. Liston's connections with the mob were well known and the NAACP was concerned about having to deal with Liston's visibility as World Champion and had encouraged Patterson not to fight Liston, fearing that a Liston victory would tarnish the civil rights movement. Patterson said John F. Kennedy also did not want him to fight Liston.

Patterson lost his title to Liston in Chicago on September 25, 1962, by a first-round knockout in front of 18,894 fans. The two fighters were a marked contrast. In the ring, Liston's size and power proved too much for Patterson's guile and agility. However, Patterson did not use his speed to his benefit. According to Sports Illustrated writer Gilbert Rogin, Patterson did not punch enough and frequently tried to clinch with Liston. Liston battered Patterson with body shots and then shortened up and connected with two double hooks high on the head. The result at the time was the third-fastest knockout in boxing history. After being knocked out, Patterson left Comiskey Park in Chicago wearing dark glasses and a fake beard for the drive back to New York. After the fight, questions were raised on whether the fight was fixed to set up a more lucrative rematch. Overnight, Patterson seemed to lose his public support as a result of his swift knockout. Despite the defeat, Patterson won $2 million, to be paid over 17 years.

The rematch was set for April 1963; however, Liston injured his knee swinging a golf club and the fight was delayed three months to July 22. In Las Vegas that night, Patterson attempted to become the first boxer to win the heavyweight title three times, but Liston once again knocked him out in the first round. Patterson lasted four seconds longer than in the first bout.

After the title
Following these defeats, Patterson went through a depression. However, he eventually recovered and began winning fights again, including top victories over Eddie Machen and George Chuvalo; the Chuvalo match won The Rings "Fight of the Year" award.

Muhammad Ali 
Patterson was now the number-one challenger for the title held by Muhammad Ali. On November 22, 1965, in Las Vegas, in yet another attempt to be the first to win the world heavyweight title three times, he went into the fight with an injured sacroiliac joint in a bout in which Ali was clearly dominant. Ali called Patterson an "Uncle Tom" for refusing to call him Muhammad Ali (Patterson continued to call him Cassius Clay) and for his outspokenness against black Muslims. Before the match, Patterson had said:

"This fight is a crusade to reclaim the title from the Black Muslims. As a Catholic, I am fighting Clay as a patriotic duty. I am going to return the crown to America."

Instead of scoring a quick knockout, Ali mocked, humiliated and punished Patterson throughout the fight but was unable to knock him out before the referee finally stopped the fight in the 12th round.

End of career 
Patterson remained a legitimate contender. In 1966 he traveled to England and knocked out British boxer Henry Cooper in just four rounds at Wembley Stadium.

When Ali was stripped of his title for refusing induction into the military, the World Boxing Association staged an eight-man tournament to determine his successor. Patterson fought Jerry Quarry to a draw in 1967. In a rematch four months later, Patterson lost a controversial 12-round decision to Quarry. Subsequently, in a third and final attempt at winning the title a third time, Patterson lost a controversial 15-round referee's decision to Jimmy Ellis in Stockholm, in 1968, despite breaking Ellis's nose and scoring a disputed knockdown.

In September 1969 he divorced his first wife, Sandra Hicks Patterson, who wanted him to quit boxing, while he still had hopes for another title shot.

Patterson continued on, defeating Oscar Bonavena in a close fight over ten rounds in early 1972.

At age 37, Patterson was stopped after seven rounds with a cut eye while still competitive in a rematch with Muhammad Ali for the NABF heavyweight title on September 20, 1972. The defeat proved to be Patterson's last fight, although there was never an announcement of retirement.

Retired life
In retirement, he and Ingemar Johansson became good friends who flew across the Atlantic to visit each other every year and he served two terms as chairman of the New York State Athletic Commission. He was also inducted into the International Boxing Hall of Fame in 1991.

Patterson lived in New Paltz, New York, for many years with his second wife, Janet Seaquist. They had two daughters, Jennifer and Janene. In 1982 and 1983 he ran the Stockholm Marathon together with Ingemar Johansson. He completed the 1983 New York City Marathon in 3:35:27.

His adopted son, Tracy Harris Patterson, was a world champion boxer in the 1990s and was trained by Floyd during part of his career. They are the first father and son to win world titles in boxing. Floyd also trained Canadian heavyweight Donovan "Razor" Ruddock in 1992 for his fights with Greg Page, Phil Jackson, and Lennox Lewis.

The New Paltz High School football field was named "Floyd Patterson Field" in 1985.

Death
Patterson suffered from Alzheimer's disease and prostate cancer in his final years. He died at home in New Paltz, on May 11, 2006, at the age of 71.  His body was buried at New Paltz Rural Cemetery in New Paltz, Ulster County, New York.

Quotes
 "It's easy to do anything in victory. It's in defeat that a man reveals himself."
 "They said I was the fighter who got knocked down the most, but I also got up the most." (This quote was used in the tenth episode of the 2009 TV series V.)
 "When you have millions of dollars, you have millions of friends."
 On boxing: "It's like being in love with a woman. She can be unfaithful, she can be mean, she can be cruel, but it doesn't matter. If you love her, you want her, even though she can do you all kinds of harm. It's the same with me and boxing. It can do me all kinds of harm but I love it."

Professional boxing record

See also
 List of heavyweight boxing champions

References

Further reading
 
 Mulvaney, Kieran, Patterson an all-time great outside the ropes. ESPN.com, May 12, 2006.
 Victory Over Myself by Floyd Patterson with Milton Gross. Published by Bernard Geis Associates, distributed by Random House, 1962. Library of Congress Catalog Number: 62-15657.

External links
 Floyd Patterson, Rocky Marciano & Classic Boxing Trilogy
 
 
https://www.wbaboxing.com/wba-history/world-boxing-association-history
https://boxrec.com/media/index.php/NYSAC_World_Heavyweight_Champion
 Floyd Patterson profile at Cyber Boxing Zone
 Boxing Hall of Fame
 ESPN.com
 
 
 
 Floyd Patterson memoriam  at sportsecyclopedia.com
 Floyd Patterson obituary at The Daily Telegraph

1935 births
2006 deaths
African-American boxers
Boxers at the 1952 Summer Olympics
Deaths from dementia in New York (state)
Deaths from Alzheimer's disease
Deaths from cancer in New York (state)
Deaths from prostate cancer
International Boxing Hall of Fame inductees
New York State Athletic Commissioners
Olympic boxers of the United States
Olympic gold medalists for the United States in boxing
Sportspeople from Brooklyn
People from Hempstead (town), New York
World Boxing Association champions
Winners of the United States Championship for amateur boxers
World heavyweight boxing champions
People from Cleveland County, North Carolina
People from New Paltz, New York
American male boxers
Medalists at the 1952 Summer Olympics
Middleweight boxers
Light-heavyweight boxers
Boxers from North Carolina
Boxers from New York City
African-American Catholics
20th-century African-American sportspeople